Sebastião Lucas da Fonseca (26 July 1927 – 27 January 2000), known as Matateu, was a Portuguese footballer who played as a striker.

His professional career, which spanned more than 20 years, was closely associated to Belenenses. He won the Bola de Prata twice during his spell with the club, and scored 219 goals in 291 Primeira Liga games, being dubbed the World's Eighth Wonder.

Matateu's was Belenenses most-capped ever player for the Portugal national team.

Club career
Born in Lourenço Marques, Portuguese Mozambique, Matateu started his career playing for local teams João Albasini, 1º de Maio and Manjacaze. He signed with C.F. Os Belenenses in Portugal in 1951, scoring Primeira Liga 17 goals in 26 games in his first season as the Lisbon side finished in fourth position and adding 29 in the same number of matches in the following campaign – third place.

From 1953 to 1960, Matateu continued scoring in double digits (a minimum of 14 goals), netting a career-best 32 in 1954–55 for his team's final runner-up position (and his second Silver Ball award). In 1960, he helped his main club win the Portuguese Cup against Sporting CP (2–1); he left in the summer of 1964 at the age of 37, after only appearing in a combined four games in his last two seasons due to a serious leg injury from which he never fully recovered.

Matateu then joined neighbouring Atlético Clube de Portugal of the second division, helping to promotion in his second year. In the 1966–67 season – his final in the Portuguese top flight – the 39-year-old contributed with nine goals in 21 appearances, but the team suffered relegation after ranking second bottom (13th position); in the following three years, he played with Clube Desportivo de Gouveia in the second tier and amateur football with Amora F.C. and G.D. Chaves.

Matateu retired from professional football well past his 40s, after spending several years in Canada, where he played in the National Soccer League with Toronto First Portuguese. In 1971 he headed westward to Victoria, British Columbia, and represented Latino in the Vancouver Island Soccer League; he played a pivotal role in the creation of Sagres Victoria.

International career
Matateu earned 27 caps for Portugal, and scored 13 goals. After making his debut on 23 November 1952 in a friendly with Austria in Porto, his last appearance was against Yugoslavia on 22 May 1960 for the 1960 European Nations' Cup (1–5 away loss, he netted in the first leg, a 2–1 win), aged 32.

Matateu never played internationally with his compatriot Eusébio although he had been called for the final 1962 FIFA World Cup qualifiers (where the latter made his debut), being left out of the squads for the matches against Luxembourg and England.

Personal life / Death
Matateu's younger brother, Vicente, was also a footballer. A defender, he played 13 years with Belenenses (sharing teams with his sibling during ten), and also represented the Portugal national team.

He died on 27 January 2000 at the age of 72, in the Victoria General Hospital in British Columbia, after a long battle with illness.

References

External links

1927 births
2000 deaths
Mozambican emigrants to Portugal
Sportspeople from Maputo
Mozambican footballers
Portuguese footballers
Association football forwards
Primeira Liga players
Liga Portugal 2 players
C.F. Os Belenenses players
Atlético Clube de Portugal players
Amora F.C. players
G.D. Chaves players
Toronto First Portuguese players
Canadian National Soccer League players
Portugal international footballers
Mozambican expatriate footballers
Portuguese expatriate footballers
Expatriate soccer players in Canada
Portuguese expatriate sportspeople in Canada